Gulshan Lal Tandon was a pioneer in the Indian Mining Industry, the former Chairman of Coal India Limited who played a major role in establishment of Coal India.  Mr. Tandon received Padma Bhushan, India's third highest civilian honour, in 1986 for his services to Indian mining industry. He died on 2 August 2012.

Career
Gulshan Lal Tandon received his B Tech degree in Mining from Indian School of Mines, Dhanbad in 1951. He served as the Chairman of Neyveli Lignite Corporation and Coal India Ltd. Mr. Tandon was convenor of the Ministry of Industry for evaluation of PSUs in Mineral and Power Sector. He has been director of several companies like Sharda Motor Industries Ltd, Indian Metals & Ferro Alloys ltd, VBC Industries Ltd and Tanishq Consultancy among others.

Awards
 Padma Bhushan - 1986,
 Sir Jahangir Gandhy Gold Medal from Tata's XLRI,
 Best Manager & Best Managed Company from FICCI and AIEO,
 Bheeshma Pitamah & Field Marshal in Mining by I B C & KIOCL Association,
 Udyog Ratan from Institute of Economic Studies in 1984,
 NMDC Gold Medal,
 Best Management & Profitable Company from National Productivity Council,
 All prestigious Awards of MGMI,
 Engineering Personality of the Country - 1994.

References

Recipients of the Padma Bhushan in civil service
2012 deaths
Indian Institute of Technology (Indian School of Mines), Dhanbad alumni